This list of military installations consists of a collection of military related lists worldwide:

List of Australian military bases
List of Royal Australian Air Force installations
List of Royal Australian Navy bases
List of Brazilian military bases
List of Bulgarian military bases
List of Burmese military installations
List of Canadian Forces Bases
List of Chinese Air Force Bases
List of Danish Military Installations
List of Greek military bases
List of Honduran military bases
List of Indian Air Force stations
List of Irish military installations
List of Israel Defense Forces bases
List of Mexican military installations
List of New Zealand military bases
List of Pakistan Air Force Bases
List of Russian military bases abroad
List of military installations in Saudi Arabia
List of Singapore Armed Forces bases
List of bases of the South African Air Force
List of South African military bases
List of Soviet Air Force bases
List of Sri Lankan air force bases

United Kingdom
List of British Army installations
List of Royal Air Force stations
List of Battle of Britain airfields
List of V Bomber dispersal bases
List of air stations of the Royal Navy
List of Royal Navy shore establishments
List of airfields of the Army Air Corps (United Kingdom)
List of UK Thor missile bases
British Forces Germany

United States

 List of United States Air Force installations
 List of United States Space Force installations
 List of former United States Army installations
 List of United States Navy installations
 List of United States Marine Corps installations
 List of United States Coast Guard stations
 List of United States Army installations in Afghanistan
 Bulgarian–American Joint Military Facilities
 List of United States Army installations in Germany
 List of United States Army installations in Italy
 List of United States Military installations in Iraq
 List of United States Army installations in Kosovo
 List of United States Army installations in Kuwait
 List of United States Army installations in South Korea

NATO bases
See Category:Military installations of NATO

SHAPE (Supreme Headquarters Allied Powers Europe) in Casteau, north of Mons (Belgium), since 1966 (before in Paris). SHAPE is since 2003 the headquarters of Allied Command Operations (ACO) controlling all allied operations worldwide.
NATO Communications and Information Agency (NCI Agency) in The Hague, Mons (Belgium) and Brussels
Parts of Allied Command Transformation (based in Norfolk, Virginia) in SHAPE's headquarters. Addition command elements include the Joint Warfare Centre (JWC) located in Stavanger, Norway (in the same site as the former Norwegian NJHQ); the Joint Force Training Centre (JFTC) in Bydgoszcz, Poland; the Joint Analysis and Lessons Learned Centre (JALLC) in Monsanto, Portugal; and the NATO Undersea Research Centre (NURC), La Spezia, Italy.  
Allied Joint Force Command Brunssum in Brunnsum, Netherlands.
E-3 Sentry AWACS (Airborne Warning and Control System) based in NATO Air Base Geilenkirchen, Germany.
Chièvres Air Base, Belgium.
3 Boeing C-17 Globemaster III based at Pápa Air Base, Hungary. Part of the NATO Heavy Airlift Wing.